Brestovăț (until 1892 Bresztovác;) is a commune in Timiș County. It is composed of five villages: Brestovăț (commune seat), Coșarii, Hodoș, Lucareț and Teș.

History 
Brestovăț first appears in written history as Breztolcz in 1440; at that time, it belonged to the Șoimoș Fortress. It was destroyed during the Turkish occupation and resettled in 1718–1722. Turks called it Aga, an unofficial name that persisted for a while and was taken over by Hungarians and later by the Romanian administration. 

Between 1735 and 1737, 113 families of Montenegrin Serbs, mostly Orthodox, settled here. In 1797, Brestovăț became the property of the Lukács brothers, who colonized a large number of Hungarian and Slovak settlers here. Around 1828, now a property of Iosif Gaal, it was again colonized by Hungarians from Nógrád, Nyitra and Trencsén. The colonizations do not stop here, because in 1840–1845, German settlers from Bohemia arrived in Brestovăț.

Demographics 

Brestovăț had a population of 674 inhabitants at the 2011 census, down 18% from the 2002 census. Most inhabitants are Romanians (76.26%), larger minorities being represented by Slovaks (15.13%), Serbs (1.63%), Hungarians (1.48%) and Roma (1.19%). For 3.71% of the population, ethnicity is unknown. By religion, most inhabitants are Orthodox (74.78%), but there are also minorities of Roman Catholics (17.66%) and Baptists (2.82%). For 3.71% of the population, religious affiliation is unknown.

References 

Communes in Timiș County
Localities in Romanian Banat
Place names of Slavic origin in Romania